Emily Fisk Giffin (born March 20, 1972) is an American author of several novels commonly categorized as chick lit.

Her notable works include Something Borrowed, Heart of the Matter and The One and Only.

Early life 
Emily Giffin was born on March 20, 1972.  She attended Naperville North High School in Naperville, Illinois (a suburb of Chicago), where she was a member of a creative writing club and served as editor-in-chief of the school's newspaper. Giffin earned her undergraduate degree at Wake Forest University, where she double-majored in history and English and also served as manager of the basketball team. She then attended law school at the University of Virginia.

Career
After graduating from law school in 1997, she moved to Manhattan and worked in the litigation department of Winston & Strawn.  In 2001, she moved to London and began writing full-time.  Her first young adult novel, Lily Holding True, was rejected by eight publishers. Giffin began a new novel, then titled Rolling the Dice, which became the bestselling novel Something Borrowed, released in 2004, which received positive reviews and made it to the New York Times bestsellers list.    

Giffin found an agent in 2002 and signed a two-book deal with St. Martin's Press.  While doing revisions on Something Borrowed, she found the inspiration for a sequel, Something Blue (2005). In 2006, her third novel, Baby Proof, made its debut. She spent 2007 finishing her fourth novel, Love the One You're With.

Nine of her novels have been international bestsellers. Three appeared simultaneously on USA Today'''s Top 150 list. Something Borrowed was adapted into a major feature film (released on May 6, 2011), and its sequel novel, Something Blue, has also been optioned for film.

Novels
 Something Borrowed (2004)
 Something Blue (2005)
 Baby Proof (2006)
 Love the One You're With (2008)
 Heart of the Matter (2010)
 The Diary of Darcy J. Rhone (2012): Prequel to Something Blue and Something Borrowed Where We Belong (2012)
 The One and Only (2014)
 First Comes Love (2016)
 All We Ever Wanted (2018)
 The Lies That Bind (2020)
 Meant to Be'' (2022)

References

External links 
 

1972 births
20th-century American lawyers
21st-century American novelists
21st-century American women writers
American chick lit writers
American expatriates in England
American women novelists
Litigators
Living people
New York (state) lawyers
Novelists from Georgia (U.S. state)
Novelists from Illinois
Novelists from Maryland
University of Virginia School of Law alumni
Wake Forest University alumni
Writers from Atlanta
Writers from Baltimore
Writers from Chicago
Writers from Naperville, Illinois
20th-century American women lawyers
People associated with Winston & Strawn